Neil Winokur (born 1945) is an American photographer based in New York City. Winokur's work is in the collections of the Metropolitan Museum of Art, the Museum of Modern Art, and the Los Angeles County Museum of Art.

Biography 
Born and raised in New York City, Winokur attended Hunter College, graduating with a degree in math and physics in 1967. Winokur currently works in management at the Strand Bookstore, where he has worked on and off for four-plus decades as a book purchaser.

Artistic practice 
In the early 1970s, Winokur began taking photos after borrowing a camera from a friend, initial experimenting in black and white urban scenes. In 1987, Winokur received a Guggenheim Fellowship in the Creative Arts for his photography.

Exhibitions 
 1989 - The Photography of Invention: American Pictures - National Museum of American Art
 1991 –  Pleasures and Terrors of Domestic Comfort - MoMA

Public collections 

 Museum of Modern Art
 Metropolitan Museum of Art
 Los Angeles County Museum of Art

References 

Living people
1945 births